Elihu William Nathan Starr, born in New Haven, Connecticut, on August 10, 1812, was the ninth Adjutant General of the State of Connecticut.    He was later elected to the position of town clerk for the City of Middletown.  He also served as treasurer and Judge of Probate

Military career
At the age of 18, Starr was appointed sergeant major into the Second Artillery Regiment in the Connecticut militia.  He was later appointed to quartermaster and then as adjutant.  In 1836 he was elected captain of the First Rifle Company, Sixth Infantry Regiment.  In 1839 he was promoted to the rank of lieutenant colonel and then elected as brigadier general of the Second Brigade, Connecticut Militia.  In 1852, Starr was appointed to the position of Connecticut Adjutant General by Governor Thomas H. Seymour.

Personal life
Elihu was the eldest son of Nathan and Grace Starr who moved from New Haven, Connecticut, to Middletown shortly after Elihu’s birth.  On May 27, 1840, he married Harriet Wetmore Bush of Ogdensburg, New York, and had seven children; William, Henry, Frank, Grace, Julia, Margaret and Mary.  Elihu died June 14, 1891, in Middletown.  His wife died in 1904.

References

Military personnel from Connecticut
Connecticut Adjutant Generals
1812 births
1891 deaths